Charles Ali (born August 23, 1984) is a former American football fullback. He was signed by the Cleveland Browns as an undrafted free agent in 2007. He played college football at Arkansas-Pine Bluff.

Ali has also been a member of the New York Sentinels, Baltimore Ravens, and Arizona Cardinals.

College career
Ali attended the Arkansas-Pine Bluff where he started at linebacker/defensive end but made the switch to fullback. He was a business management major.

Professional career

Cleveland Browns
After the Browns' last preseason game in 2007, Ali survived the final roster cut becoming backup to fullback Lawrence Vickers. Ali was the only undrafted free agent to make the team out of camp. He made his NFL debut versus the Cincinnati Bengals on September 16. He was cut by the Browns during the final roster cut-down on September 5, 2009.

New York Sentinels
Ali joined the New York Sentinels of the United Football League for the 2009 season.

Baltimore Ravens
Ali signed with the Baltimore Ravens on November 25, 2009. He was waived on December 12.

Following the season, the Ravens re-signed Ali to a future contract on January 22, 2010. Ali was waived on April 28, 2010.

Arizona Cardinals
Ali signed with the Arizona Cardinals on May 7, 2010. He was waived on August 29, 2011,

External links
Just Sports Stats
Official website

1984 births
Living people
Players of American football from St. Louis
American football fullbacks
Arkansas–Pine Bluff Golden Lions football players
Cleveland Browns players
New York Sentinels players
Baltimore Ravens players
Arizona Cardinals players
Sacramento Mountain Lions players